The men's 500 metres races of the 2014–15 ISU Speed Skating World Cup 6, arranged in the Thialf arena in Heerenveen, Netherlands, were held on the weekend of 7–8 February 2015.

Race one was won by Pavel Kulizhnikov of Russia, while Artur Waś of Poland came second, and Nico Ihle of Germany came third. Alex Boisvert-Lacroix of Canada won Division B of race one, and was thus, under the rules, automatically promoted to Division A for race two.

Kulizhnikov also won race two, while Mo Tae-bum of South Korea came second, and Nico Ihle of Germany came third. Keiichiro Nagashima of Japan won Division B of race two.

Race 1
Race one took place on Saturday, 7 February, with Division B scheduled in the morning session, at 11:35, and Division A scheduled in the afternoon session, at 15:53.

Division A

Division B

Race 2
Race two took place on Sunday, 8 February, with Division B scheduled in the morning session, at 11:35, and Division A scheduled in the afternoon session, at 15:42.

Division A

Division B

References

Men 0500
6